Tang Bin (born 25 April 1986 in Fengcheng, Dandong, Liaoning) is a female Chinese rower, who competed for Team China at the 2008 Summer Olympics, winning the gold medal in the women's quadruple sculls with Jin Ziwei, Xi Aihua and Zhang Yangyang.

Major performances
 2005 National Games – 1st fours;
 2007 World Championships – 3rd quadruple sculls;
 2007 World Cup Amsterdam – 1st quadruple sculls

References

External links
 2008 Team China

1986 births
Living people
Olympic gold medalists for China
Olympic rowers of China
Sportspeople from Dandong
Rowers at the 2008 Summer Olympics
Rowers at the 2012 Summer Olympics
Olympic medalists in rowing
Chinese female rowers
Asian Games medalists in rowing
Medalists at the 2008 Summer Olympics
Rowers at the 2010 Asian Games
World Rowing Championships medalists for China
Asian Games gold medalists for China
Medalists at the 2010 Asian Games
People from Fengcheng, Liaoning
Manchu sportspeople
Rowers from Liaoning
20th-century Chinese women
21st-century Chinese women